Michael Palma (born 1945 Bronx, New York) is an American poet and translator.

Life
He lives with his wife in Bellows Falls, Vermont.  He is on the board of the Italian Poetry Society of America.  He has read at the Italian Cultural Institute.

Awards
 1997 Raiziss/de Palchi Book Prize from the Academy of American Poets.
 Italo Calvino Award from the Translation Center of Columbia University.
 Premio Speciale of the Associazione Culturale Campana of Latina, Italy.
 2005, 2006, 2007 National Endowment of the Arts grants.

Works

Poetry
 
  (chapbook)
  (chapbook)

Translations
 
 Franco Buffoni (2002). The Shadow of Mount Rosa. Translator Michael Palma.

Editor

Memoir

References

1945 births
Living people
Writers from the Bronx
American male poets
Italian–English translators
Translators of Dante Alighieri
20th-century American poets
20th-century American translators
20th-century American male writers
21st-century American poets
21st-century American translators
21st-century American male writers
Poets from New York (state)